Subsessor is a genus of snake in the family Homalopsidae. The genus is monotypic, containing the sole species Subsessor bocourti. The species is commonly known as Bocourt's mud snake or Bocourt's water snake and has traditionally been placed in the genus Enhydris.

Etymology
Both the specific name, bocourti, and the common name, Bocourt's water snake, refer to French zoologist Marie Firmin Bocourt.

Geographic range and habitat
S. bocourti is found in a wide range of stagnant fresh water habitats in Mainland Southeast Asia. Records from China are questionable.

Description
A robust snake, S. bocourti can surpass  in length.

Reproduction
S. bocourti is a live bearing species, giving birth to, on average, 3-8 fully formed neonate snakes.

Diet
S. bocourti feeds on frogs, fishes, and crustaceans.

Commercial use
Bocourt's water snake is widely caught for its skin and sometimes also eaten.

References

Further reading
Boulenger GA (1896). Catalogue of the Snakes in the British Museum (Natural History). Volume III. Containing the Colubridæ (Opisthoglyphæ and Proteroglyphæ) ... London: Trustees of the British Museum (Natural History). (Taylor and Francis, printers). xiv + 727 pp. + Plates I-XXV. ("Hypsirhina bocourtii [sic]", pp. 10–11).
Chan-ard, [Mr.] Tanya; Parr, John W. K.; Nabhitabhata, Jarujin (2015). A Field Guide to the Reptiles of Thailand. New York: Oxford University Press. 352 pp. (Enhydris bocourti, p. 239).
Jan G (1865). "Enumerazione sistematica degli ofidi appartenenti al gruppo Potamophilidae ". Archivio per la Zoologia, l'Anatomia e la Fisiologia 3 (2): 201-265. (Hypsirhina bocourti, new species, pp. 258–260). (in Italian).
Murphy, John C.; Voris, Harold K. (2014). "A Checklist and Key to the Homalopsid Snakes (Reptilia, Squamata, Serpentes), with the Description of New Genera". Fieldiana: Life and Earth Sciences (8): 1-43. (Subsessor, new genus, p. 33; S. bocourti, new combination, p. 34, Figure 50).
Smith MA (1943). The Fauna of British India, Ceylon and Burma, Including the Whole of the Indo-Chinese Sub-region. Reptilia and Amphibia. Vol. III.—Serpentes. London: Secretary of State for India. (Taylor and Francis, printers). xii + 583 pp. (Enhydris bocourti, new combination, pp. 388–389).

Colubrids
Monotypic snake genera
Reptiles described in 1865
Reptiles of Southeast Asia